Sara Louise "Sally" Ball is an American poet, editor, and professor. She is the author of Annus Mirabilis (Barrow Street Press, 2005). Her poems and essays have appeared in literary journals and magazines including American Poetry Review, Harvard Review, Pleiades, Ploughshares, Rivendell, Slate, Threepenny Review, Salmagundi, The Southwest Review, The Threepenny Review, Yale Review, and the Review of Contemporary Fiction.

Life 
She earned her B.A. from Williams College, and her M.F.A. from Warren Wilson College. She taught at Beloit College, and worked at the Washington University in St. Louis International Writers Center.
She is associate director of Four Way Books.
She teaches at Arizona State University.

Honors and awards
 2011 Arizona Commission on the Arts Fellowship
 2007 Margaret Bridgman Fellow at Bread Loaf Writers' Conference

Published works
Full-Length Poetry Collections
 Hold Sway, Barrow Street Press. Forthcoming April 2019.
 
 Wreck Me, Barrow Street Press, 2013. 
Anthology Publications

References

External links

 Author Website
 Poems: "Dear Matthew" and others, Narrative, Spring 2011
 Poem: "One Story of Conversion", Poetry Daily
 Poems: "In Hannover: Clairvoyance", Drunken Boat, Spring 2005
 Poems: "Gymnasium", Ploughshares, Winter 1996–97
 Poems: "Questiones, Ploughshares, Spring 2004 
 Poem: "Visiting the Real Ranch", slate, July 15, 2008
 Poems: "Sound Bow, Lip, Mouth"; "Phobic Darling"; "After Valentine's Day", Locus Point, 31 August 2008

Arizona State University faculty
Beloit College faculty
Warren Wilson College alumni
Washington University in St. Louis faculty
Williams College alumni
Year of birth missing (living people)
Living people
American women academics
Writers from Phoenix, Arizona
American women poets
American editors
Poets from Arizona
21st-century American poets
American women essayists
21st-century American women writers
21st-century American essayists